"Get the Girl Back" is a song written and performed by American pop/rock band Hanson. It is the only single from their album, Anthem (2013). Lead vocals are provided by Taylor Hanson.

The song was released in the U.S. on April 9, 2013, and reached No. 39 on the Billboard Adult Top 40 chart, making it Hanson's first single in over nine years to chart on any US Billboard chart.

Track listing
Written by Isaac Hanson, Taylor Hanson and Zac Hanson.

 "Get the Girl Back" – 3:46

Music video
A music video for the single included actresses Nikki Reed and Kat Dennings, as well as Drake Bell and Drew Seeley, who are all fans of the band.

Reception
Adam Soybel of POP! Goes The Charts gave the song a positive review, writing that the song is "a full-out jam and soars to new levels for the band."

Chart positions

References

External links
 

2013 singles
2013 songs
Hanson (band) songs
Songs written by Isaac Hanson
Songs written by Taylor Hanson
Songs written by Zac Hanson